Roxie Nicholson is a policy analyst  who worked for much of her career at the United States Department of Labor. She retired in 2014. She  is considered an expert on welfare policy and has often been quoted by The New York Times, The Washington Post, The Weekly Standard, The Wall Street Journal, The Boston Globe, and other media on welfare to work and poverty issues. She is best known for her critique of welfare reform efforts in the 1990s which she claimed would eventually lead to more childhood poverty and underfunded block grants to states. She has been a contributor to numerous evaluations of welfare policy in the United States.

References

United States Department of Labor officials
Living people
1950 births
People from Winston-Salem, North Carolina
University of North Carolina alumni
University of Maryland, College Park alumni